Communist Party of Asturias (in Spanish: Partido Comunista de Asturias), is the federation of the Communist Party of Spain (PCE) in Asturias. The current general secretary is Francisco de Asís Fernández Junquera-Huergo.

In the 2011 Asturian elections the PCA decided to quit IU-IX and form a candidacy of its own, the Left Front, getting only 3 town councillors. After this electoral failure the PCA joined IU-IX again.

References

1978 establishments in Spain
Asturias
Political parties established in 1978
Political parties in Asturias